The UR GB class, known later as the UR / KUR EB1 class, and later still as part of the EAR 22 class, was a class of  gauge  steam locomotives built by North British Locomotive Company in Glasgow, Scotland, for the Uganda Railway (UR). Its design of GB was based upon that of the earlier UR G class.

The 34 members of the GB class entered service on the UR in 1919, and continued in service after the UR was renamed the Kenya-Uganda Railway (KUR) in 1926. Some of them were in service long enough to be also operated by the KUR's successor, the East African Railways (EAR) as part of its 22 class, from 1948 until the last ones were withdrawn in 1964.

See also

Rail transport in Kenya
Rail transport in Uganda

References

Notes

Bibliography

Kenya-Uganda Railway locomotives
Metre gauge steam locomotives
NBL locomotives
Railway locomotives introduced in 1919
Steam locomotives of Kenya
Steam locomotives of Uganda
Uganda Railway locomotives
4-8-0 locomotives
Scrapped locomotives